Shibtu (reigned  1775 BC –  1761 BC) was the wife of Zimrilim and queen consort of the ancient city-state of Mari in modern-day Syria. Historian Abraham Malamat described her as "the most prominent of the Mari ladies."

Life
Shibtu was born to the royal family of the kingdom of Yamhad. Her parents were Yarim-Lim I, king of Yamhad, and Gashera, his queen consort. Zimrilim was forced to flee Mari when his father the king, Iakhdunlim, was assassinated in a palace coup and Yasmah-Adad usurped the throne. Zimrilim allied himself with Yarimlim of Yamhad who helped him regain his throne in Mari and their alliance was cemented with the marriage of Zimrilim to Shibtu. Zimrilim and Shibtu's offspring included at least seven daughters. One of them was appointed as the mayor of a nearby town. Several of their daughters went on to marry into other royal families from the ancient Near East, including Ibbatum, who married Himidiya, the king of Andarik, and Inib-Sharri who married Ibal-Addu, ruler of Ashlakka.

Queen of Mari

Shibtu enjoyed extensive administrative powers as queen. During Zimrilim's absence, Shibtu handled the administration of the city, the royal palace and the temple. The tablets found at Mari reveal regular correspondence between Shibtu and her husband in his absence. The letters were mostly administrative in nature, including reports on the state of the city and military and intelligence briefings. Personal letters were also exchanged, including one notifying the king of her giving birth to a boy and girl twins. Shibtu's letters reflected deep affection for her husband and concern over his health and wellbeing during his campaigns. Zimrilim, likewise, sent letters back updating her on his battles and whereabouts, and instructing her on the running of the city. In one of her letters, Shibtu informs Zimrilim, upon his request, on the oracle's prophecy that the Babylonian attack against Mari would end in failure. The prophecy, however, was wrong and the Babylonians under Hammurabi sacked Mari in 1761 BC.

In addition to her political roles, Shibtu managed and supervised her large household and the industries of the palace workshops.

Political agency and wealth

According to Sabloff, Shibtu was “second-in-command” and followed behind her husband. As she would usually represent Zimrilim, she would make official visits and travel around the kingdom on his behalf. Whilst he entrusted Shibtu with kingdom and palace affairs, the governing council was mostly consulted for major decisions. Historian accounts reflect upon the potential power the principal wives such as Shibtu has on the policies. In her case, some historian accounts suggest she is acknowledged as a woman with visions and dreams of political ambitions. Furthermore, when Zimrilim’s mother died, Shibtu was authorized to administer reserves of precious materials such as metal and wool. Shibtu also received continuous gifts from her father amongst others.

References

Citations

Bibliography

18th-century BC women rulers
Ancient queens consort
Mari, Syria
Year of birth unknown
18th-century BC deaths
Ancient Mesopotamian women
Yamhad dynasty
18th-century BC people